A Holiday to Remember is a 1995 American made-for-television Christmas romantic-drama film starring Connie Sellecca and Randy Travis. It premiered on CBS on December 12, 1995.  As of 2009, it was shown in the 25 Days of Christmas programming block on ABC Family, but it was not part of the block in 2010 and re-emerged on the competing AMC Best Christmas Ever block in 2019. The film's score was composed by Eric Robertson.

Plot
At Christmastime, Carolyn (Connie Sellecca) leaves the big city for her childhood village in the forest, with her daughter Jordy (Asia Vieira) in tow. Along the way, Carolyn meets the ex-fiancé (Randy Travis) she left at the altar years before, as well as a lost boy she would like to adopt, though Jordy is unenthusiastic.

Cast
Connie Sellecca as Carolyn Giblin
Randy Travis as Clay Traynor
Rue McClanahan as Miz Leona
Asia Vieira as Jordy Giblin

See also 
 List of Christmas films

References

External links
 

1995 television films
1995 films
1995 romantic drama films
1990s Christmas drama films
American Christmas films
American romantic drama films
CBS network films
Films directed by Jud Taylor
Christmas television films
American drama television films
1990s American films